Kiambu is a town in Kiambu County, Kenya within the Nairobi Metropolitan Region. It has a population of 147,870. It is the capital of the Kiambu County, which bounds the northern border of Nairobi. Other proximate towns are Ruiru (east of Kiambu), Gatundu (NE), Limuru (NW) and Kabete (SW).

Transport

Public Service Vehicles to Kiambu can be boarded at Commercial near Odeon cinema in Nairobi. The saccos include Sony Classic, Nakwe Sacco, and Kaka travellers. Fare ranges between shs. 50–150.

Commerce

Many offices are located in the metropolitan town e.g. KCB, NHIF, NSSF, KPLC, Equity Bank, Cooperative Bank, National Bank, Metropolitan Teacher's Sacco, Family Bank etc.  

There are two main supermarkets i.e. Kamindi Supermarket and Cleanshelf Supermarket.  
 
The town is surrounded by hilly Kikuyu farmland although is under urbanisation as Nairobi is growing fast and more people settle in neighbouring towns.

Administration 

Apart from central Kiambu, there are villages such as Ndumberi, Riabai, Kihingo, Ngegu, Kanunga and Kangoya among others. The town's administration is under the County Government of Kiambu, which came into force with the promulgation of Kenya's constitution in 2010. Kiambu is also centre of Kiambaa, an administrative division and electoral constituency of Kiambu District.

Infrastructure
Kiambu is seen as a future anchor to the capital city Nairobi which is undergoing rapid development with limited space for growth.

The town is a favoured location for real estate development with projects such as Migaa by Home Afrika, Riverside estate, Edenville estate and Four Ways Junction.

Kiambu Club, opened in 1916, is one of the oldest nine-hole golf courses in Kenya. The club also has other facilities like tennis courts and swimming pools. The club's main lounge is in honour of Kenya's first First Lady, also an honorary member of the club, Mama Ngina Kenyatta.

Education

In the outskirts of Kiambu town is Kiambu High School, a nationally recognized boarding school for its performance in academics and sports.

Other high performance schools are ACK St.James Academy inside the town's metropolitan and St.Ann Gichocho

There is also a science college i.e. Kiambu Institute of Science and Technology.

Other upcoming colleges are Pettans Driving and Computer College and Dykaan College

Religion

Churches in the town include ACK St.James Cathedral Kiambu, St.Peter and Paul Catholic church, PCEA Kiambu church, Word of Faith Kiambu church, AIC Kiambu church etc.

Notes 

Kiambu County
Populated places in Central Province (Kenya)
County capitals in Kenya